Pavlovac is a neighbourhood in the municipality of Banja Luka, Republika Srpska, Bosnia and Herzegovina.

References
 Pavlovac is a neighborhood that has about 6–10.000 people in it

Populated places in Banja Luka